Bartosz Machaj (born 30 April 1993) is a Polish footballer who plays as a midfielder for RKS Radomsko.

Career
On 22 June 2019 Elana Toruń confirmed, that they had signed Machaj on a one-year contract.

External links

References

1993 births
Living people
Association football midfielders
Polish footballers
Ekstraklasa players
I liga players
II liga players
III liga players
Śląsk Wrocław players
Miedź Legnica players
Chrobry Głogów players
Elana Toruń players
Unia Janikowo players
RKS Radomsko players
People from Głogów
Sportspeople from Lower Silesian Voivodeship